Rosane Ewald (born 27 August 1973) is a Brazilian sports shooter. She competed in the women's 10 metre air rifle event at the 2016 Summer Olympics.

References

External links
 

1973 births
Living people
Brazilian female sport shooters
Olympic shooters of Brazil
Shooters at the 2016 Summer Olympics
Place of birth missing (living people)
Shooters at the 2015 Pan American Games
South American Games bronze medalists for Brazil
South American Games medalists in shooting
Competitors at the 2010 South American Games
Pan American Games competitors for Brazil
20th-century Brazilian women
21st-century Brazilian women